"You're a Superstar" is a song by Canadian Eurodance group Love Inc. It was released in June 1998 as the second single from the album Love Inc., after "Broken Bones." "You're a Superstar" was Love Inc.'s biggest hit, peaking at number 13 on the Canadian RPM Top Singles chart and number one on the RPM Dance Chart. It also peaked at number eight in Spain and number 23 in the Netherlands.

In the United Kingdom, the song was a commercial failure during its original release in 2000, but two years later, it was re-released and peaked at number seven for four weeks in December 2002 and January 2003. In Scotland, the song reached number two in early January 2003. Its success in the UK allowed the song to receive a gold certification from the British Phonographic Industry in 2021 for sales and streams exceeding 400,000.

In 2020, the song was used as a lipsync number in the first season finale episode of Canada's Drag Race, which was won by Priyanka. In the same year, Love Inc.'s Simone Denny appeared on CBC Television's annual New Year's Eve special, performing the song as part of Tyler Shaw's set.

Track listings

Canadian maxi-CD single (1998)
 "You're a Superstar" (City of Love radio mix) – 4:00
 "You're a Superstar" (City of Love club mix) – 5:46
 "You're a Superstar" (The Dogwhistle Soundsystem) – 7:05
 "You're a Superstar" (Mono Inc. Love club edit) – 5:39

US CD single (1998)
 "You're a Superstar" (radio mix) – 4:00
 "You're a Superstar" (City of Love club mix) – 5:46
 "You're a Superstar" (Ether Dub) – 7:33
 "You're a Superstar" (Scotty Marz vocal mix) – 6:41
 "You're a Superstar" (Scotty Marz Supa Dub) – 6:52

Spanish 12-inch vinyl (1999)
A1. "You're a Superstar" (Giorgio's Mix) – 5:30
A2. "You're a Superstar" (Miami Playa Mix) – 7:03
B1. "You're a Superstar" (5:30 A.M. Remix) – 7:23
B2. "Broken Bones" (Ruff Driverz vocal mix) – 6:48

UK CD single (2000)
 "You're a Superstar" (original version)
 "You're a Superstar" (Xenomania radio mix)
 "You're a Superstar" (Wayne 6 Luvs Petra Mix)

UK CD single (2002)
 "You're a Superstar" (radio edit) – 3:23
 "You're a Superstar" (City of Love Mix) – 5:46
 "You're a Superstar" (Pez Tellett Remix) – 4:51
 "You're a Superstar" (Rezonance Q Remix) – 5:57

Australian maxi-CD single (2003)
 "You're a Superstar" (radio edit '03) – 3:23
 "You're a Superstar" (City of Love Mix) – 5:46
 "You're a Superstar" (Pez Tellett Remix) – 4:51
 "You're a Superstar" (Rezonance Q Remix) – 5:57
 "You're a Superstar" (Wayne G Heaven Anthem Mix) – 9:37

Charts

Weekly charts

Year-end charts

Certifications

Release history

References

1998 songs
1998 singles
1999 singles
2002 singles
Love Inc. (group) songs
Bertelsmann Music Group singles
LGBT-related songs
Logic Records singles
NuLife singles
Songs written by Vincent DeGiorgio
ViK. Recordings singles